Miklós Nyiszli (17 June 1901 – 5 May 1956) was a Hungarian prisoner of Jewish heritage at Auschwitz concentration camp. Nyiszli, his wife, and young daughter, were transported to Auschwitz in June 1944. Upon his arrival, Nyiszli volunteered as a doctor and was sent to work at No. 12 barracks where he operated on and tried to help the ill with only the most basic medical supplies and tools. He was under the supervision of Josef Mengele, a  officer and physician.

Mengele decided after observing Nyiszli's skills to move him to a specially built autopsy and operating theatre. The room had been built inside Crematorium II, and Nyiszli, along with members of the 12th , was housed there.

Early life
Nyiszli was born 17 June 1901 in Transylvania, Kingdom of Hungary (then the Hungarian-half of Austria-Hungary). He completed his medical degree in 1929. Following this, he specialized in forensic pathology in Germany. He returned to Transylvania with his wife and daughter in 1937 before migrating to Hungary in 1940. In 1942, he and his family were sent to a work camp in Desești before being transferred to Auschwitz concentration camp in 1944.

Authorship 
During Nyiszli's period in the camp, he witnessed many atrocities to which he refers in his book, Auschwitz: A Doctor’s Eyewitness Account, also published under the name Auschwitz:  An Eyewitness Account of Mengele's Infamous Death Camp. Historian Gideon Greif characterized Nyiszli's assertion that "soap and towels were handed out to the victims" as they entered the gas chambers and that "toxic gas was released from the showerheads" as among the “myths and other wrong and defamatory accounts” of the Sonderkommando that flourished in the absence of first-hand testimony by surviving Sonderkommando members.

Accounts of camp life
While imprisoned, Nyiszli was forced to carry out medical experiments and perform autopsies on dozens of bodies, particularly on dwarfs and twins. Mengele had researched the causes of dwarfism and twinning, and used Nyiszli to gather more information. Nyiszli autopsied murdered prisoners, or those suspected to have died from infectious diseases. Mengele was searching for evidence supporting the "inferiority of the Jewish race". At one point Nyiszli was forced to carry out physical exams on a father-son pair and, after their deaths, to prepare their skeletons for study at the Anthropological Museum in Berlin.

One day, following the gassing of a transport load of prisoners, Nyiszli was summoned by Sonderkommando working in the gas chambers who had found a girl alive under a mass of bodies in a chamber. Nyiszli and his fellow prisoners did their best to help and care for the girl, but she was eventually discovered and shot. This incident was dramatized in the films The Grey Zone and Son of Saul.

Nyiszli was appalled by the disregard for human life and lack of empathy for human suffering shown by the guards and officers. However, his actions were dictated by his tormentors, and he was forced to perform what he considered immoral acts. As he said:

During his roughly eight months in Auschwitz, Nyiszli observed the murders of tens of thousands of people, including the slaughter of whole sub-camps at once. These sub-camps held different ethnic, religious, national, and gender groups, including a Romani camp, several women's camps, and a Czech camp. Each sub-camp housed between 5,000–10,000 prisoners or more. Nyiszli was often told which camps were next to be exterminated, signaling that an increased workload was imminent.

When Nyiszli discovered that the women's camp in which his wife and daughter were kept prisoner, Camp C, was to be liquidated, he bribed an SS officer to transfer them to a women's work camp. Nyiszli remained in Auschwitz until shortly before its liberation by the Soviet army on 27 January 1945. On 18 January, Nyiszli, along with an estimated 66,000 other prisoners, was forced on a death march through various Nazi territories  and further into various smaller concentration camps in Germany.

Nyiszli narrated his testimony of camp life in an objective tone, favoring an analytical approach over a more emotive description. He writes that he tells his story "not as a reporter but as a doctor". This style has been referred to by some as documentary realism.

After Auschwitz
Nyiszli's first major stop after the forced march out of Auschwitz was the Mauthausen concentration camp in northern Austria, near the city of Linz. After a three-day stay in a quarantine barracks at Mauthausen, he spent two months in the Melk an der Donau concentration camp, about three hours away by train.

After 12 months of imprisonment, Nyiszli and his fellow prisoners were liberated on 5 May 1945, when U.S. troops reached the camp. Nyiszli's wife and daughter also survived Auschwitz and were liberated from Bergen Belsen. He never again worked with a scalpel after the war.

He wrote the book Dr Mengele boncoló orvosa voltam az auschwitz-i krematóriumban.

Death

Nyiszli died of a heart attack on 5 May 1956 in Oradea, Romania, at the age of 54. His widow, Margareta, died on 5 September 1985.

Dramatization
 Auschwitz Lullaby, a 1998 play by James C. Wall, printed: 2000 ; audiocassette & CD: 2000, 
 The Grey Zone, a 2001 film by Tim Blake Nelson
 Son of Saul, a 2015 film by László Nemes

See also
 Sanitätswesen
 Max Planck Society

References

Bibliography

External links
 HolocaustForgotten.com
 JewishVirtualLibrary.org
 Holocaust-History.org
 Account - Dr Miklos Nyiszli, prisoner of Auschwitz

1901 births
1956 deaths
People from Șimleu Silvaniei
Hungarian Jews
Romanian Jews
Auschwitz concentration camp survivors
20th-century Hungarian physicians
Auschwitz concentration camp medical personnel